Forbach railway station is a railway station in Forbach in the Moselle department of north-eastern France. It is the last station in France before the German border at Saarbrücken.

Services

The following train services serve the station as of 2022:

See also
List of border crossing points in France

References

External links

Railway stations in Moselle (department)
France–Germany border crossings
Railway stations in France opened in 1851